Substantial gainful activity is a term used in the United States by the Social Security Administration (SSA). Being incapable of substantial gainful employment is one of the criteria for eligibility for Supplemental Security Income (SSI) or Social Security Disability Insurance (SSDI) benefits. It is known as the "SGA requirement," and is defined in Section 520 of the Social Security Act.

To be eligible for SSI, an applicant must meet the following three conditions: they must have little or no income or resources, be considered medically disabled, and either not be working or working but earning less than the substantial gainful activity level. To be eligible for SSDI, an applicant must have worked and paid Social Security taxes for enough years to be covered under Social Security, as well as being medically disabled and either not be working or working but earning less than the substantial gainful activity level.

Substantial gainful activity is defined by the Internal Revenue Service as "the performance of significant duties over a reasonable period of time while working for pay or profit, or in work generally done for pay or profit."

Inability to engage in substantial gainful activity means that if a person works, they earn less than a certain amount of money. For non-blind people, the amount set by the SSA for 2009-10 was $980 per month. If a claimant were to earn more than the set amount, they would no longer be considered disabled by the SSA, regardless of their medical condition, and their benefits would cease after two further disability checks.

SGA does not include any work a claimant does to take care of themselves, their families or home. It does not include unpaid work on hobbies, volunteer work, institutional therapy or training, attending school, clubs, social programs or similar activities: however, such unpaid work may provide evidence that a claimant is capable of substantial gainful activity.  Earnings derived from criminal activity count in assessing whether someone is engaged in substantial gainful activity.

References

Social security in the United States